Matt Anthony may refer to:

 Matt Anthony (ice hockey) (born 1984), Canadian ice hockey goaltender
 Matt Anthony (Canadian football) (1921–2000), Canadian football player